Groseclose Track at Brown Stadium is a stadium in Monroe, Louisiana, United States, on the campus of the University of Louisiana at Monroe. The track surrounding the field is named Groseclose Track. It is the home facility for the Louisiana-Monroe Warhawks' soccer and track and field teams. The capacity of the stadium is 3,000.

Brown Stadium was the home field of the Louisiana–Monroe Warhawks football team from 1951 to 1977. The facility was renovated in 2018 as part of a $5 million project that included new offices for soccer and track coaches, locker rooms and storage areas. Press box renovations and resurfacing of the parking lot were also included. The Louisiana-Monroe Warhawks women's soccer team hosted its first match at the renovated facility in a preseason exhibition against Stephen F. Austin on August 16, 2019.

References

Athletics (track and field) venues in Louisiana
College track and field venues in the United States
American football venues in Louisiana
Defunct college football venues
Louisiana–Monroe Warhawks football
Louisiana–Monroe Warhawks track and field
Sports venues in Monroe, Louisiana
1933 establishments in Louisiana
Sports venues completed in 1933